Punishment is an Australian television soap opera made by the Reg Grundy Organisation for Network Ten in 1981.

Set in a fictional men's prison, the series attempted to present a male version of its female counterpart Prisoner, which was set in a woman's prison. Attempts by the show's makers to differentiate the series from Prisoner saw Punishment imbued with greater realism; however, the formula did not attract high viewing figures. Network Ten deemed the new series a failure after only three episodes had gone to air, and it was quickly removed from the schedules. The remainder of the 26 episodes produced were shown out-of-ratings later that year. Unusually for a soap opera, the series was taped using the single camera technique.

Grundy produced Punishment mainly to complement Prisoner in international sales, to a point that the pilot was initially telecast in the United States before debuting in Australia. KTLA, the Los Angeles television station that helped launched Prisoner in the United States, originally expressed interest in doing the same with Punishment; it is unknown if KTLA had screened any episodes of Punishment, in light of its failure on Network Ten in Australia.

The programme created by Reg Watson was produced and directed by Alan Coleman. The regular cast featured many notable Australian actors. Mel Gibson played a prisoner in the first two episodes. Kris McQuade played the girlfriend of Gibson's character and was phased out of the series after the first few episodes due to Gibson's departure.

Cast
 Mel Gibson - Rick Munro (2 episodes)
 Ken Wayne - Jack Hudson
 Brian Wenzel - Wally Webb
 Stephen Yardley - Mike Rogers
 Barry Crocker - Governor Alan Smith
 Ralph Cotterill - Russell Davis
 Michael Preston - Larry Morrison
 Brian Harrison - Sam Wells
 Michael Smith - Paul Wells
 George Spartels - David Roberts
 Julie McGregor - Julie Smith
 Kris McQuade - Kate Randall
 Cornelia Frances - Cathy Wells
 Arthur Sherman - Andy Epstein
 Anne Haddy - Alice Wells
 Penne Hackforth-Jones - Heather Rogers
 Lisa Peers - Roslyn Rowney

Episode list

Home media

Available at (National Film and Sound Archives)

References

External links

Aussie Soap Archive: Punishment
Punishment at the National film and Sound Archive

Australian television soap operas
Network 10 original programming
1981 Australian television series debuts
1981 Australian television series endings
Australian prison television series
English-language television shows
Television series produced by The Reg Grundy Organisation
1980s prison television series